Girolamo Pieri Pecci Ballati Nerli (21 February 1860 – 24 June 1926), was an Italian painter who worked and travelled in Australia and New Zealand in the late 19th century influencing Charles Conder and Frances Hodgkins and helping to move Australian and New Zealand art in new directions. His portrait of Robert Louis Stevenson in the Scottish National Portrait Gallery Edinburgh, is usually considered the most searching portrayal of the writer.

Biography 

Born in Siena in Italy to an Italian aristocrat, Marchese Ferdinando Pieri Pecci Ballati Nerli, his full name was Girolamo Pieri Pecci Ballati Nerli. The fourth of six children, he was not a 'Marchese' as he was sometimes styled, or a 'Count', but a 'patrizio di Siena', a minor distinction marking the great antiquity of his family. His father married Henrietta Medwin, an Englishwoman. Her father Thomas Medwin was a minor literary figure in Byron's circle, the author of Journal of the Conversations of Lord Byron and of The Life of Percy Bysshe Shelley; Medwin was a second cousin on both parents' side of Shelley.
Girolamo studied art in Florence under Antonio Ciseri and Giovanni Muzzioli and was a younger member of the Italian Macchiaioli school, the 'patch painters', an Italian movement anticipating French Impressionism.

He went to Australia in 1885 spending time in Melbourne and Sydney where he was an associate of Tom Roberts and Arthur Streeton and an influence on Charles Conder at the time of the Heidelberg School. Nerli's role in that movement has been disputed but his presence and influence are undeniable.

He went first to Melbourne but by 1887 was in Sydney where he encountered Conder. He caused a sensation there late that year with his exhibition of paintings of bacchanalian orgies, and in 1888 his portrait of Myra Kemble the actress attracted much attention at the exhibition of the Royal Art Society at Sydney. The free brushwork and unfinished  appearance of the works were as exciting to connoisseurs as the subjects were to the general public. In 1889 he was back in Melbourne, apparently in the company of the Heidelberg painters. Late in 1889 he went to Dunedin in New Zealand for the New Zealand and South Seas Exhibition where he encountered the artist Alfred Henry O'Keeffe. He went back to Australia in 1890.

In August 1892 he visited Samoa and painted the well-known portrait of R. L. Stevenson, now in the Scottish National Portrait Gallery. A portrait in pastel done during the same visit was bought by Scribner and Sons, New York, in 1923. Stevenson wrote some humorous doggerel verse recording their encounter.

In 1893 Nerli returned to Dunedin where he set himself up as a private art teacher. 'Signor Nerli' remained in the city just over three years bringing new vigour to the circle presided over by W.M. Hodgkins and a cosmopolitan glamour to Dunedin's second, bohemian circle of younger painters. He taught Frances Hodgkins, inspired O'Keeffe and reportedly had an affair with Grace Joel, a young woman artist he may also have known in Melbourne. In 1893 Nerli was elected to the council of the Otago Art Society and in 1894 set up the Otago Art Academy with J.D. Perrett and L.W. Wilson in Dunedin's Octagon. Its life classes employing a professional nude model were so successful that the government run Dunedin School of Art had to hire Nerli for the same purpose. It seems this was the means by which painting from the nude was inaugurated at the school.

Late in 1896 Nerli left Dunedin suddenly, stayed briefly in Wellington and went on to Auckland. He opened a studio there and exhibited at the Auckland Society of Arts in April 1897. He then eloped with Marie Cecilia Josephine Barron whom he married in Christchurch New Zealand, in March 1898. She was a Spinster of 23, and he said he was a Bachelor and Artist of 38; he gave his name as Girolamo Pieri Ballati Pecci Nerli, but the surname in the index was "Pecci".  The couple immediately sailed for Australia settling first in Sydney and then Melbourne. Nerli and his wife returned to Europe in 1904 where the artist spent the rest of his life, struggling against declining fortunes, between London and Nervi, Genoa in Italy. He died childless in Nervi on 24 June 1926.

Legacy 
An occasionally brilliant painter, Nerli brought something of the new influences emerging in Europe to the Australasian art scene, helping to shift the direction of Australian and New Zealand art. In Charles Conder and Frances Hodgkins he influenced those countries' most notable expatriates. A few of his works have secured him a lasting place in Australia's and New Zealand's art histories. The Sitting (1889) is worthy of James Tissot, and Nerli's lost work, The Ascension (c.1887) was a technical tour de force anticipating aspects of 20th-century art. His landscapes of the Heidelberg period, Beach Scene, Black Rock and Fitzroy Gardens (both c. 1889) show him combining the new objectivity which superseded romantic landscape with a lyricism worthy of the French Impressionists. However, his greatest achievements are a few penetrating portraits, that of Robert Louis Stevenson already mentioned, his Portrait of Dr. D.M. Stuart (1894), Portrait of W.M. Hodgkins (1893) in the Hocken Collections Dunedin, and his Portrait of a Young Woman Artist (c.1889), also in the Hocken. These works capture elusive psychological states, Stevenson's illness and Stuart's nearness to death. Nerli's Portrait of a Girl (1894?) in the collection of the Dunedin Public Art Gallery is a minor masterpiece, brilliantly evoking the ambivalence of adolescence.

Nerli is represented in the Australian National Gallery, most of the Australian state galleries and the principal public collections of New Zealand.

List of works 
 Works in the collection of the Museum of New Zealand Te Papa Tongarewa

References

Further reading 
 Brown, H.G. & Keith, H. (1969 & 1988) An Introduction to New Zealand Painting 1839-1980 Auckland, NZ: David Bateman. .
 Dunn, M. (2005) Nerli an Italian Painter in the South Pacific Auckland, NZ: Auckland University Press. .
 Entwisle, P. (1984)  William Mathew Hodgkins & his Circle Dunedin, NZ: Dunedin Public Art Gallery. 
 Entwisle, P. Dunn, M. & Collins, R. (1988) Nerli An Exhibition of Paintings & Drawings Dunedin: NZ Dunedin Public Art Gallery. .
 Entwisle, P.(1993) Nerli, Girolamo in The Dictionary of New Zealand Biography Volume Two 1870-1900 Wellington, NZ: Bridget Williams Books, Department of Internal Affairs. .

External links 
 Entry in Australian Dictionary of Biography by Barbara Chapman
 Entry in Dictionary of New Zealand Biography by Peter Entwisle
 Notes by Una Platts

1860 births
1926 deaths
Australian painters
New Zealand painters
Australian people of Italian descent
19th-century Italian painters
Italian male painters
20th-century Italian painters
19th-century Italian male artists
20th-century Italian male artists
[https://www.academia.edu/98255134/THE_ARTIST_GIROLAMO_NERLI_1860_1926_NOT_NEARLY_IN_CATHOLIC_ITALY_BUT_CLEARLY_IN_NEW_ZEALAND_and_OZ